The international Gaon Digital Chart is a chart that ranks the best-performing international songs in South Korea. The data is collected by the Korea Music Content Association. Below is a list of songs that topped the weekly, monthly, and yearly charts, as according to the Gaon 국외 (Foreign) Digital Chart. The Digital Chart ranks songs according to their performance on the Gaon Streaming, Download, BGM, and Mobile charts.

Weekly charts

Monthly charts

Year-end chart

References

International 2013
Korea International
2013 in South Korean music